Blackie or Blacky is the nickname of:

People

Blackie
 George Blackburn (American football) (1913–2006), American collegiate football head coach
 Blackie Chen, Taiwanese television host
 Blackie Collins (1939–2011), American knife maker and designer
 Alvin Dark (1922–2014), Major League Baseball player and manager
 Sam Dente (1922–2002), Major League Baseball player
 Paloma Efrom (died 1977), Argentine journalist and singer
 Petr Hošek (born 1989), Czech heavy metal guitarist
 Blackie Ko (1953–2003), Taiwanese film director, producer, stuntman and actor 
 Blackie Lawless (born 1956), American singer
 James T. Licavoli (1904–1985), American mobster
 Gus Mancuso (1905–1984), American Major League Baseball player, coach, scout and radio sports commentator
 E. Blackburn Moore (1897–1980), American politician
 Blackie Sherrod (1919–2016), American journalist and sportswriter 
 Carlisle Towery (1920–2012), National Basketball Association and League player

Blacky
Joachim Fuchsberger (1927–2014), German actor, television host, lyricist and businessman
Christian Schwarzer (born 1969), German retired handball player
Jean-Yves Thériault (born 1962), Canadian bassist for the thrash/progressive metal band Voivod

Fictional characters
 Boston Blackie, created by author Jack Boyle
 "Blackie" Drago, the real name of one of six Marvel Comics villains named The Vulture
 Nelson "Blackie" Hernandez, a recurring character in Narcos who works for the Medellín Cartel and is frequently seen by Escobar's side
 Blackie or Blackford Oakes, protagonist of a series of novels by William F. Buckley, Jr.
 Blackie Parrish, on the soap opera General Hospital
 Father John Blackwood "Blackie" Ryan, protagonist of 17 mystery novels by Roman Catholic priest Father Andrew Greeley

See also 

 
 

Lists of people by nickname